Albert Montañés and Santiago Ventura were the defending champions, but lost in the quarterfinals to Łukasz Kubot and Oliver Marach.

Seeds

Draw

Finals

External links
Draw

Doubles